Vernon High School is a 3A high school located in Vernon, Texas, United States. It is part of the Vernon Independent School District located in south central Wilbarger County.   In 2013, the school was rated "Met Standard" by the Texas Education Agency.

Athletics
The Vernon Lions compete in cross country, volleyball, football, wrestling, basketball, golf, competitive bass fishing, team and individual tennis, track, softball, and baseball.

State Titles
Football 
1990(3A)
Girls Basketball 
1985(3A)
Boys Track 
1998(3A) (tie)

State Finalists  
Football 
1989(3A) 
Boys Basketball 
1950(2A)

• Softball

-2018(4A)

State Semifinalists

+ Softball

-2017(4a)

References

External links
 

Schools in Wilbarger County, Texas
Public high schools in Texas